Carys McAulay (born 18 January 1998) is a Scottish track and field athlete who mainly competes over 400 metres.

Early life
Scotland-born, and a former Bridgewater High School, Warrington pupil, and Priestley College student, she ran for Warrington Athletics Club.

Career
McAulay competed in the 800 metres at the 2015 World Youth Championships in Athletics in Cali, Colombia. She finished fourth running a time of 2:53. That year she was also selected for the Commonwealth Youth Games held in Apia, Samoa, where she the silver medal for Scotland for the event.

After a change to Trafford Athletics Club and committing to the shorter 400 metres distance, McAulay set a new personal best of 52.86 s over the distance in Geneva in June 2022 to put her third in the Scottish rankings for that year. She was selected to run for Scotland at the Birmingham Commonwealth Games. However, she was forced to pull-out with injury during the championships as her teammates ran for the bronze medal in the women's 4 x 400 m relay.

McAulay ran an indoor personal best of 52.98 s in the 400 m to finish third at the 2023 British Indoor Championships in February, one of ten Scottish medalists at the championships. She was subsequently selected for the Great Britain squad at the European Indoor Championships held in Istanbul. It was the first British senior selection for McAulay.

References

1998 births
Living people
Scottish female sprinters 
British female athletes